The National Front (Fronte Nazionale, FN) was a neo-fascist political party in Italy.

It was founded in 1990 by Franco Freda and adopted a policy against "racial mixing" and immigration, whilst also opposing Zionism, what it called 'cosmo-politics', and the influence of the United States and international finance. The group published an economic journal L'antibancor, as well as Rubric, a members' bulletin. It became moribund after the 1995 conviction of Freda and 49 other members of the party under the Scelba Law which banned the refoundation of the National Fascist Party.

See also
National Front (Italy, 1997)

References

1990 establishments in Italy
Defunct organisations designated as terrorist in Italy
Defunct nationalist parties in Italy
Neo-fascist organisations in Italy
Neo-fascist parties
Political parties established in 1990
Political parties with year of disestablishment missing
Years of Lead (Italy)